Veterans Barrington Park is an urban park located in Los Angeles City Council District 11, Los Angeles, California. It features a baseball field, a leash-less dog park, and a grassy play area.

References

Parks in California
Parks in Los Angeles County, California
Parks in Los Angeles